Félix-Alexandre Guilmant (12 March 1837 – 29 March 1911) was a French organist and composer. He was the organist of La Trinité from 1871 until 1901. A noted pedagogue, performer, and improviser, Guilmant helped found the Schola Cantorum de Paris. He was appointed as Professor of Organ at the Paris Conservatoire in 1896.

Biography 
Guilmant was born in Meudon. A student first of his father Jean-Baptiste and later of the Belgian master Jacques-Nicolas Lemmens, he became an organist and teacher in his place of birth.

In 1871 he was appointed to play the organ regularly at la Trinité church in Paris, and this position, organiste titulaire, was one he held for 30 years. Guilmant was known for his improvisations, both in the concert and church setting. His inspiration came from gregorian chants, and he was greatly noted amongst his colleagues for his mastery of the melodies.  From then on, Guilmant followed a career as a virtuoso; he gave concerts in the United States (the first major French organist to tour that country), and in Canada, as well as in Europe, making especially frequent visits to England. His American achievements included a 1904 series of no fewer than 40 recitals on the largest organ in the world, the St. Louis Exposition Organ, now preserved as the nucleus of Philadelphia's Wanamaker Organ.

With his younger colleague André Pirro, Guilmant published a collection of scores, Archives des Maîtres de l'Orgue (Archives of the Masters of the Organ), a compilation of the compositions of numerous pre-1750 French composers. The collection was printed in ten volumes, the first in 1898 and the last (which Guilmant did not live to finalize) in 1914.  Guilmant provided a rather similar survey of organ pieces by foreign composers, publishing l'École classique de l'Orgue (Classical School of the Organ). These anthologies, despite all the musicological developments which have taken place since Guilmant's own time, remain very valuable sources of early music.

In 1894 Guilmant founded the Schola Cantorum with Charles Bordes and Vincent d'Indy. He taught there up until his death at his home in Meudon, near Paris, in 1911. In addition, he taught at the Conservatoire de Paris where he succeeded Charles-Marie Widor as organ teacher in 1896.  As a teacher, Guilmant was noted for his kindness and attention to detail.  His students' recollections feature accounts of a particular focus on all facets of a note: attack, release, character.  Marcel Dupré was the most celebrated of his many students.  Others included Augustin Barié, Joseph-Arthur Bernier, Joseph Bonnet, Alexandre Eugène Cellier, Abel Decaux, Gabriel Dupont, Charles Henry Galloway, Philip Hale, Edgar Henrichsen, Édouard Mignan, and Émile Poillot. 

Guilmant's interest in Marcel Dupré began when the latter was a child. Albert Dupré, father of the celebrated Marcel, studied organ with Guilmant for seven years prior to his son's birth.  In Dupré's memoirs, he includes an anecdote where Guilmant visits his mother upon his birth and declares that the child will grow up to be an organist.  After frequent visits throughout his childhood, Marcel Dupré began studying with Guilmant formally at age 11.  From this time until his death, Guilmant championed the young virtuoso and did much to advance his career. Guilmant's house was later purchased then demolished by Dupré and rebuilt. His home organ was also sold to Dupré.

Compositions 

Guilmant was an accomplished and extremely prolific composer. Unlike Widor, who produced a great deal of music in all the main genres, Guilmant devoted himself almost entirely to works for his own instrument, the organ. His organ output includes: 'Pièces dans différents styles', published in 18 books; 'L'organiste pratique', published in 12 books; Eighteen 'Pièces Nouvelles'; and 'L'Organiste liturgique', published in 10 books. Guilmant's Eight Sonatas were conceived with the Cavaillé-Coll organ of La Trinité in mind, and are therefore symphonic in style and form, taking their place alongside the symphonic organ works of César Franck and the Organ Symphonies of Charles-Marie Widor.

The Sonate No. 1/Symphonie No. 1 for organ and orchestra, Op. 42, was programmed by Sergei Koussevitzky in the 1930s, but was not heard again until Igor Buketoff revived it for a 1977 live recording with the Butler University Orchestra (note, the composer's name is misspelled "Gilmont" in the source).

Though few in number, his works for instruments besides the organ have not been entirely neglected. For example, the Morceau Symphonique is one of the most frequently performed trombone solos, enjoying longstanding popularity among both professional and advanced student trombonists.

Opus list

References

External links
 Alexandre Guilmant on culture.gouv.fr
 Alexandre Guilmant on Naxos
 Alexandre Guilmant on bach-cantatas
  on the Rieger organ of the Christ Church Cathedral, Oxford.

Free scores
 
 e-Partitions Many newly edited and typeset organ scores.
 Free scores by Guilmant Alexandre on loumy.org

1837 births
1911 deaths
People from Meudon
French classical composers
French male classical composers
French composers of sacred music
Composers for pipe organ
French classical organists
French male organists
Academic staff of the Conservatoire de Paris
Academic staff of the Schola Cantorum de Paris
Burials at Montparnasse Cemetery
Male classical organists